Radiodiffusion Française (RDF) was a French public institution responsible for public service broadcasting.

Created in 1944 as a state monopoly (replacing Radiodiffusion Nationale), RDF worked to rebuild its extensive network, destroyed during the war. It was replaced in 1949 by Radiodiffusion-Télévision Française (RTF).

RDF managed four radio stations: Le Programme National (The National Program), Le Programme Parisien (The Parisian Program), Paris-Inter and Radio-Sorbonne (the latter produced by the Sorbonne University). Also, it managed the TV channel RDF Télévision française. All stations are fully run by the French government.

References

Radio in France
Television networks in France
Public broadcasting in France